Mike Soucy (born September 8, 1971) was born in Boston, MA and grew up in Woonsocket, RI. Soucy joined The Methadones in 2002 and played with them until their official hiatus in 2011. He is currently the drummer for Airstream Futures and formerly of The Bomb and Dan Vapid and the Cheats and has also played live with Noise By Numbers. Soucy plays the same green Ludwig super classic drums that he bought back in 1992. He alternates between a Pearl Ultracast snare and CandC Drum company snares. He also uses Zildjian cymbals and Vic Firth 3A sticks.

On December 18, 2018, Soucy joined band mates Dan Vapid and Simon Lamb on stage at the Black Moon Gallery, in Oak Park, IL playing tambourine.

Partial discography

The Methadones
Career Objective – Thick Records (2003)
Not Economically Viable – Thick Records (2004)
21st Century Power Pop Riot – Red Scare Industries (2006)
This Won't Hurt... – Red Scare Industries (2007)
The Methadones/The Copyrights Split – Transparent Records (2008)
The Methadones – Asian Man Records (2010)

The Bomb
Indecision – No Idea Records (2005)
Speed Is Everything – No Idea Records (2009)
The Challenger – No Idea Records (2011)
Axis of Awesome – No Idea Records (2015)

Dan Vapid and the Cheats
Dan Vapid and the Cheats – Torture Chamber Records (2012)
Two – Torture Chamber Records (2013)

Airstream Futures

Spirale Infernale - Paper and Plastick (2018)

References

1971 births
Living people
American punk rock drummers
American male drummers
20th-century American drummers
The Methadones members
The Bomb (band) members
Dan Vapid and the Cheats members
21st-century American drummers
20th-century American male musicians
21st-century American male musicians